Andrew Hughes (born 27 June 1995 in Manchester, England) is a rugby union player who most recently played for Sale Sharks. His regular position is in the back row.

Career

Youth

At youth level, Hughes played rugby for Bolton School and also skippered Lancashire at various youth levels. He started his senior career at Preston Grasshoppers.

Sale Sharks

Hughes signed a two-year deal with Sale Sharks prior to the 2013–14 season, where he mostly played for their academy side, the Sale Jets. He made his first class debut for Sale Sharks on 10 October 2013 in their 2013–14 European Challenge Cup match against , coming on as a replacement for the last five minutes of the match in a 33–10 victory. He was an unused replacement in their Challenge Cup match against fellow English side Worcester Warriors, but made his domestic debut against the same opposition, starting their 20–6 victory in the 2013–14 LV Cup in January 2014 and also played in their match against the Ospreys the following week.

In the 2014–15 season, Hughes made two further appearances for Sale Sharks in the LV Cup and also played in the European Rugby Champions Cup for the first time; he was an unused sub in their Round Three match against Saracens, but made his European Rugby Champions Cup debut the following week against the same opposition, coming on as a replacement in a 28–15 defeat. Hughes also featured in their final pool stage match against Irish side Munster.

During the 2014–15 season, Hughes also joined National League 1 side Fylde on a dual registration basis and made three appearances for the side.

Representative rugby

Hughes was a member of the England Under-18 squad that won the 2013 European Under-18 Rugby Union Championship in Grenoble, beating hosts France in the final.

References

1995 births
Living people
English rugby union players
Fylde Rugby Club players
Rugby union flankers
Rugby union locks
Rugby union number eights
Rugby union players from Manchester
Sale Sharks players